Bike Magazine may refer to:

 BIKE Magazine, a British cycling magazine
 Bike (magazine) a UK motorcycling magazine

See also
 Classic Bike 
 Performance Bikes (magazine)
 SuperBike (magazine)